Cnemaspis purnamai is a species of geckos endemic to Belitung Island in Indonesia.

References

Cnemaspis
Reptiles described in 2017
Reptiles of Indonesia
Endemic fauna of Indonesia